Disney Enterprises may refer to:
The Walt Disney Company, known as Walt Disney Productions until 1986, a publicly traded company on the New York Stock Exchange.
Disney Enterprises, Inc., subsidiary of The Walt Disney Company; owner of Disney trademarks and holder of Disney copyrights.
Disney Consumer Products, former division of The Walt Disney Company; succeeded by Disney Parks, Experiences and Consumer Products.
Retlaw Enterprises, originally Walt Disney Inc, a private company owned separately by Walt Disney himself.
Walt Disney Imagineering or WED Enterprises, subsidiary of The Walt Disney Company: research, development and engineering.